Drycothaea spreta is a species of beetle in the family Cerambycidae. It was described by Henry Walter Bates in 1885. Its known habitat is Mexico.

References

Calliini
Beetles described in 1885